Sleepaway Camp III: Teenage Wasteland (released as Nightmare Vacation III in the United Kingdom) is a 1989 American slasher film and the third installment in the Sleepaway Camp film series. Written by Fritz Gordon and directed by Michael A. Simpson, it stars Pamela Springsteen as Angela, Tracy Griffith, Mark Oliver, and Michael J. Pollard. Taking place one year after the events in the previous film, it again follows the same transgender serial killer Angela targeting more teenagers at another summer camp.

A fourth film called Sleepaway Camp IV: The Survivor was intended to be released in 1992, but production stopped after the company went bankrupt upon shooting less than forty minutes (which was followed by a DVD release of the footage and one of a cobbled together cut). In 2008, Return to Sleepaway Camp (2008), a direct sequel to the original film was released.

Plot
One year after the events of the second film, Maria is heading to camp. Suddenly, she is chased into an alleyway and run over by a garbage truck, driven by Angela, who throws Maria's body into the back and compacts it. Angela poses as Maria in order to board the bus to Camp New Horizons.

After arriving, news reporter Tawny Richards asks Angela to get her some cocaine. Angela gives her Ajax cleaner instead, which kills Tawny when she snorts it. After the campers have settled in, camp counselors Herman and Lily Miranda and Officer Barney Whitmore split the campers into three groups. Angela is placed in a group with Herman, Snowboy, Peter and Jan.

While camping, Angela, leaving Snowboy and Peter to fish, finds Herman and Jan having sex and kills them both with a stick. That night, Angela sets off a firecracker in Peter's nose and burns Snowboy alive, along with the other bodies.

The next morning, Angela travels to Lily's campsite, where Bobby, Cindy, Riff and Arab are camping. Angela switches places with Arab and decapitates her with an axe. Lily sets the campers out on a trust building exercise where Angela, having grown tired of the girl’s whiny and bigoted behavior, attaches Cindy to a flag pole and drops her from a high height, killing her. After killing Cindy and grabbing the trash bag Lily wanted her to take out, she has a flashback of the cafeteria scene from the second film, after luring her outside of the kitchen, Angela buries Lily in a trash hole and runs over her head with a lawnmower. Angela then rips Bobby's arms off before stabbing Riff with tent spikes.

The following morning, Angela travels to the remaining camp, where Barney, Tony, Marcia, Anita and Greg are camping. Angela tells Barney she is supposed to switch with Marcia. Barney accompanies them and Angela fakes a leg injury. As Barney tends to Angela, Marcia discovers Lily's body, after Angela tells her that Lily is just doing nothing outside and for Marcia to see. Barney yells for Marcia to run. After a tense stand-off Angela shoots Barney dead. Angela catches up with Marcia and captures her.

That night, Angela ties the remaining campers together. She shows them the body of Barney and forces them to find Marcia in one of the cabins. Upon finding Marcia, Greg and Anita are killed by booby traps. Angela decides to let Marcia and Tony live but as she tries to leave Angela is stabbed numerous times by Marcia.

Marcia and Tony summon the police to the camp. Angela is taken to the hospital in an ambulance and she stabs a paramedic and a policeman with a syringe. When the ambulance driver asks what is going on, Angela replies "Just taking care of business".

Cast

Pamela Springsteen as Angela Baker / "Maria"
Tracy Griffith as Marcia Holland
Mark Oliver as Tony DeHerrera
Kim Wall as Cindy Hammersmith
Daryl Wilcher as Riff
Sandra Dorsey as Lily Miranda
Michael J. Pollard as Herman Miranda
Cliff Brand as Officer Barney Whitmore
Haynes Brooke as Bobby Stark
Kyle Holman as Snowboy
Jill Terashita as Arab
Kashina Kessler as Maria Nacastro
Randi Layne as Tawny Richards
Chung Yen Tsay as Greg Nakashima
Jarret Beal as Peter Doyle
Sonya Maddox as Anita Bircham
Stacie Lambert as Jan Hernandez

Production
Like the first sequel, the third film was shot at a YMCA youth camp in Atlanta and Waco, Georgia. The first two sequels were shot back-to-back, with Part 3 beginning production three days after the second film had finished; shooting took place from October 12 to October 31, 1987.

Several sequences of violence had to be trimmed in order for the MPAA to give the film an R rating. Anchor Bay Entertainment included some of this deleted footage on its 2002 DVD release.

According to the commentary from the 2002 Survival Kit DVD, production of this film began immediately after Sleepaway Camp II wrapped up and production of both films lasted a total of six weeks, ending on Halloween 1987 with the filming of the first scene of this movie in which Angela runs down Maria with a garbage truck. This scene was filmed in downtown Atlanta near the intersection of Mitchell St and Forsyth St.

Valerie Hartman, who portrayed the character of Ally in the previous film, is credited in the sequel as an assistant to the director and as a "raccoon wrangler".

Releases

Home media
Sleepaway Camp III was released on VHS in the United States by Nelson Entertainment on December 15, 1989.

The film has been released twice on DVD in the United States by Anchor Bay Entertainment, first in 2002 with a single DVD edition, as well as in the Sleepaway Camp Survival Kit. Both these releases are currently out of print.

Anchor Bay Entertainment also released the title on DVD in the United Kingdom on 31 May 2004.

Scream Factory, under license from MGM, released the film for the first time on Blu-ray, on June 9, 2015, along with Sleepaway Camp II: Unhappy Campers.

Reception
AllMovie gave it a negative review, writing Sleepaway Camp III: Teenage Wasteland is cheaper, dumber, and more profoundly pointless, light years away from the imagination of the first film and an insult to Sleepaway Camp fans". As of February 2019, the review aggregator website Rotten Tomatoes gives the film a 13% approval rating based on 8 reviews, with an average rating of 3.6/10.

The DVD review by William Harrison states that "Sleepaway Camp III: Teenage Wasteland runs on fumes despite some fun kills and another committed performance from Pamela Springsteen as murderous, transgender Angela Baker".

Bryan Kluger of High-Def Digest, reviewed the Blu-ray version of the film. His final thoughts about the film was that "Sleepaway Camp III: Teenage Wasteland is quite the entertaining film", adding that, according to him, "it's funnier than the other films in the franchise, and, of course, bloodier".

References

External links
Official Sleepaway Camp website
 

1989 horror films
1980s comedy horror films
1989 LGBT-related films
1980s serial killer films
Sleepaway Camp 3
1980s teen comedy films
1980s teen horror films
American comedy horror films
American independent films
American sequel films
American serial killer films
American slasher films
American teen comedy films
American teen horror films
American teen LGBT-related films
Films shot in Atlanta
LGBT-related comedy horror films
Sleepaway Camp (film series)
Films about summer camps
Transgender-related films
1989 comedy films
Films set in 1989
1980s English-language films
1980s American films